The Letšeng Diamond Mine, found in the landlocked Southern African kingdom of Lesotho, is owned by Gem Diamonds, Ltd. and the government of Lesotho, and at an elevation of 3,100 m (10,000 ft) it is the world's highest diamond mine.

Production 
It is characterised by extremely low grade ore (less than /hundred tons) and is known for producing huge diamonds, having the highest percentage of large diamonds (greater than ), giving it the highest dollar value per carat of any diamond mine. The world average is roughly US$81 per carat, while Letšeng averaged over US$1,894 per carat for the first six months of 2007.

Unusual for Africa, and due to the elevation, temperatures at the mine drop to -20 °C, and snowfalls are common in winter.

Geography

Climate
Letšeng has an alpine tundra climate (ET, according to the Köppen climate classification). This means that Letšeng has a chilly climate with fairly cool temperatures throughout the year, even for Lesotho, and snowfalls can happen as well. June is the only month with an average temperature below freezing, although the average temperature of July is exactly .

However, like most of Lesotho and South Africa, this is not evenly distributed throughout the year. Letšeng has a wet season with abundant rainfall from October to March and a dry season with less precipitation from May to August - the coldest time of year. In terms of precipitation April and October serve as transitions between the wet and dry seasons. January is the wettest month, receiving  of precipitation on average, while July is the driest month, receiving only  of precipitation on average.

Significant diamond finds

Lesotho Promise 

On 4 October 2006 the 603 carat (121 g) white diamond, the Lesotho Promise was unearthed, which until the January 2018 discovery noted below was the largest reported find this century; 
at the time it was found it was the 15th largest diamond ever found. The stone is of an exceptional colour, rated D, the top colour for diamonds.

Lesotho Brown 

Previously the largest diamond found at Letšeng was the 601 carat (120 g) Lesotho Brown, recovered in 1967.

Letšeng Legacy 
On 13 September 2007 Gem Diamonds, Ltd. announced that it had found a  diamond, making it the 18th largest diamond ever found.  It was sold to the Graff-SAFDICO partnership for $10.4 million.

Star of Lesotho 

Leseli La Letšeng 
On 21 September 2008 Gem Diamonds, Ltd. announced that it found a  diamond of high quality, making it the 20th largest diamond ever found. It is a type II D colour, with  potential to yield a  cut stone. Chief executive Clifford Elphick said: "Preliminary examination of this remarkable diamond indicates it will yield a record-breaking polished stone of the very best colour and clarity, and has no inclusions visible in its rough form."

November 2010
The discovery of two large rough white diamonds was announced in November 2010. They weighed 196ct and 184ct.

Lesotho Legend
In January 2018 Gem Diamonds announced the largest diamond yet discovered at Letšeng, a Type IIa D color stone measured at 910 carats. It sold in March 2018 for $40 million. The same year a light brown diamond of 357.61 carats was discovered.

Letšeng Star
In August 2011 a diamond of 550 carats was found.

Letšeng Dynasty and Letseng Destiny
In May and July 2015, the discovery of two large diamonds was announced : the Letšeng Destiny of 314 carats and the Letšeng dynasty of 357 carats.

See also
Mining industry of Lesotho
List of largest rough diamonds
List of diamonds

References 

Diamond mines in Lesotho
Economy of Lesotho